Cheki Ashmuji is a village in Kulgam District of Jammu and Kashmir in India.

Notable people

 Nazir Ahmad Wani was the first person in Jammu and Kashmir to receive the Ashok Chakra, India's highest peacetime gallantry award

References 

Villages in Kulgam district